What Are Records? (or W.A.R.?) is an independent record label located in Boulder, Colorado. Founded in New York City in 1991 by owner Rob Gordon, former director of A&R at EMI, the company moved to Boulder in 1994.

W.A.R.? has released over 100 records by Frank Black (of The Pixies), Bill Burr, Stephen Lynch, The Samples, Maceo Parker, Melissa Ferrick, and Whitest Kids U' Know.

History
What Are Records? was founded in Gordon's New York City loft in 1991. From the beginning, it fostered a direct-to-stores and direct-to-consumers distribution strategy Friend of Gordon and The Samples then-manager, Ted Guggenheim, urged W.A.R.? to sign The Samples and they soon were among the first signings to the label. Other early acts included comedian Stephen Lynch, funk saxophone legend Maceo Parker (known for having played in James Brown’s band), former Squeeze frontman Glen Tilbrook, Grammy and Tony-nominated composer and piano man David Yazbek, singer-songwriter David Wilcox, and singer-songwriter Melissa Ferrick.

Gordon relocated the company to Boulder in 1991 and has been operating out of the offices designed by architect Charles Haertling ever since.

Current artists
Stephen Lynch
The Whitest Kids U' Know
Trace Bundy

Catalog artists

Bill Burr
Between The Lines
Cycomotogoat
Daniel MacKenzie
David Wilcox
Everything
Fancey
Felicia Michaels
Figurine
Flickerstick
Frank Black
Glenn Tilbrook
Hazard
House of Large Sizes
The Innocence Mission
Jeep
Joseph Brenna
Le Concorde
Lir
Lloyd Cole
Luce
Maceo Parker
Melissa Ferrick
Munly
The Ocean Blue
The Poppy Family
Primitive Radio Gods
The Radiators
Sally Taylor
The Samples
Sean Kelly
Stuart Matthewman
Sungha Jung
The Swayback
24-7 Spyz
Tim Finn
Tony Furtado
Ugly Americans

References

American independent record labels
Companies based in Boulder, Colorado
Record labels established in 1991
1991 establishments in New York (state)